The following is a list of media in Fargo, North Dakota and Moorhead, Minnesota, often called Fargo-Moorhead.

Print

Newspapers
The Business Journal Serving the Greater Fargo-Moorhead Area
The Concordian
Fargo Moorhead Extra (formally the Clay County Union)
The Forum of Fargo-Moorhead
High Plains Reader
MSUM Advocate
NDSU Spectrum

Directories

Magazines
The Area Woman
Bison Illustrated
Inspired Home Magazine
NDSU Magazine

Television

Radio

FM

AM

Fargo
Fargo
Fargo–Moorhead
Fargo
Lists of media in Minnesota
North Dakota-related lists